The 2018 Continental Tire SportsCar Championship is the nineteenth season of the Continental Tire SportsCar Challenge and the fifth season organized by the International Motor Sports Association (IMSA).

Classes
The class structure adds the TCR category alongside the GS and ST cars. Eligible manufacturers include Alfa Romeo, Audi, Ford, Honda, Hyundai, Kia, SEAT, Subaru, and Volkswagen. Also, the GS category will only allow cars homologated to Group GT4 regulations.

 Grand Sport (GS)
 Touring Car (TCR)
 Street Tuner (ST)

Schedule
The schedule remains unchanged, aside from the Circuit of the Americas being switched for Mid-Ohio Sports Car Course. Additionally, Watkins Glen International becomes a four-hour endurance race along with races at Daytona International Speedway and Laguna Seca. All other races are approximately two hours in length.

1 Grand Sport and TCR will participate in this race with the WeatherTech Championship's GT Daytona class and LMP3 cars in IMSA Prototype Challenge as one single four-hour race.  This race will preview the 2019 IMSA rules package and new tyre supplier Michelin.

Entry list

Grand Sport

Touring Car

Street Tuner

Notes

Race results
Bold indicates overall winner.

Team's Championship Standings

GS Team's Championship (top 10)

References

External links

Michelin Pilot Challenge
Continental Tire SportsCar Challenge
Continental Tire SportsCar Challenge